Ričardas Pauliukonis (born 31 July 1974) is a Lithuanian wrestler. He competed at the 1996 Summer Olympics and the 2000 Summer Olympics.

References

 

1974 births
Living people
Lithuanian male sport wrestlers
Olympic wrestlers of Lithuania
Wrestlers at the 1996 Summer Olympics
Wrestlers at the 2000 Summer Olympics
Place of birth missing (living people)
20th-century Lithuanian people